Bolshaya Rechka is a rural locality (a selo) in Petrovsky Selsoviet, Troitsky District, Altai Krai, Russia. The population was 181 as of 2013. It was founded in 1857.There are 4 streets.

Geography 
Bolshaya Rechka is located 11 km northeast of Troitskoye (the district's administrative centre) by road. Troitskoye is the nearest rural locality.

References 

Rural localities in Troitsky District, Altai Krai